Fake ID is a 2003 gay-themed comedy film directed by Gil D. Reyes. It is set in Louisville, Kentucky, where it was filmed.  The March 2003 premiere was held in Louisville.  The DVD was released May 25, 2004.

Cast
 Stuart Perelmuter as David
 Brian Gligor as Eric
 Nina Burns as Lauren
 Mark Fisher (actor) as Brenton
 Michael Cyril Creighton as Mikey
 Jason Decker as Max

Footnotes

References
 Fake ID at Out Films

External links
 
 

2003 films
2003 comedy films
American LGBT-related films
Films shot in Kentucky
Films set in Kentucky
Gay-related films
Films set in Louisville, Kentucky
2000s English-language films
2000s American films